Cecil Mamiit is the defending champion of the Men's Singles competition of the 2011 Southeast Asian Games but lost in the semifinals to Christopher Rungkat. Rungkat won the title by beating top seed Danai Udomchoke 6–2, 6–2 in the final.

Medalists

Draw

Seeds
The top seed received bye to the quarterfinals.

Main draw

References
Draw
SEAG2011 Start/Result Lists - Tennis

Men's Singles